Ship Recognition Manual: The Klingon Empire is a 1983 role-playing game supplement for Star Trek: The Role Playing Game published by FASA.

Contents
Ship Recognition Manual: The Klingon Empire is a handbook of the 14 most-commonly encountered ships in the Klingon Empire.

Reception
Frederick Paul Kiesche III reviewed Ship Recognition Manual: The Klingon Empire in Space Gamer No. 68. Kiesche commented that "Complaints? I have none. Well, true, I would have liked to have seen more ships for the price, but the artwork made up for that. I am happy to see the people at Fantasimulations Associates and FASA expanding the Star Trek universe."

Reviews
Different Worlds #37 (Nov./Dec., 1984)

References

Role-playing game supplements introduced in 1983
Star Trek: The Role Playing Game supplements